Strolghino  is a salami in Italian cuisine that is prepared from pork. It is thin, with an average weight of 300 grams, and may be prepared from the "lean leg meat" of the domestic pig. Leftover cuts of meat from the preparation of culatello prosciutto are typically used. It may be prepared from parts of the pig that are not used in ham. Strolghino may only be available for only a few months in some areas. It may have a relatively short curing time of 15–20 days, which results in a very tender product resembling "fresh, raw sausage meat".

In the Italian cities of Cremona and Parma, it may be referred to as "strolghino salami filzetta", and its preparation in these areas may include curing for three months. Up to around 2010, its availability in Italy was rather rare, but after this time its availability had slightly increased. As of 2012, strolghino was not protected or regulated in Italy (e.g. with a protected designation of origin or protected geographical indication).

Strolghino may be paired with champagne or wine.

Authenticity
Authentic strolghino has been described as only being prepared in the lowlands of Parma, by producers of culatello prosciutto. These preparations do not contain food preservatives, and have a shelf life of less than two months. It has also been described as having an average shelf life of 40 days. In this region, the production of culatello and strolghino runs concurrently, since strolghino is prepared from leftover cuts of culatello.

Counterfeits
Some products labeled as strolghino may be counterfeits, actually being a different type of salami or modified salami. Those labeled as strolghino that have a hard texture or spicy/salty flavor are not authentic.

See also

 Charcuterie
 List of dried foods
 List of sausages

References

Further reading
 
 
 

Italian sausages
Fermented sausages